Jak = Jaktorowo; Kol = Kolmar; Lin = Lindenwerder; Mar = Margonin; Sam (S) = Samotschin (town); Sam (L) = Samotschin (rural area)
KM=www.KartenMeister.com entry; MQ=www.MapQuest.com map.
Note: Town name spelling varied, especially whether German names were one word or two; the letters "C" and "K", "I" and "J" were often swapped.
Population data may be inaccurate (see German census of 1895).

External links 
Szamocin (official site, Polish & German only) https://web.archive.org/web/20080111035809/http://www.szamocin.umig.gov.pl/

This article is part of the project Wikipedia:WikiProject Prussian Standesamter. Please refer to the project page, before making changes.

Civil registration offices in the Province of Posen